Gia Lai is a province in the Central Highlands of Vietnam. It is the second-largest province of Vietnam. The name comes from the Jarai people, one of the local indigenous groups.

Geography

Ayun Hạ Lake

Administrative divisions
Gia Lai is subdivided into 17 district-level sub-divisions:

They are further subdivided into 15 commune-level towns (or townlets), 184 communes, and 24 wards.

References

 
Provinces of Vietnam